Worriers are an American melodic punk band from Brooklyn, New York. The band’s music is centered on the songwriting of Lauren Denitzio, the former vocalist/guitarist of The Measure (SA). Primarily a solo project, Worriers has also featured a rotating line-up of both touring musicians and in-studio contributors. The live iteration of Worriers currently includes drummer Mikey Erg, lead guitarist Frank Piegaro and bassist Allegra Anka. Alumni of the group includes Rachel Rubino, Audrey Zee Whitesides, Nick Psillas, John McLean, JP Flexner and Denitzio's ex-wife Lou Hanman, among others. They have released records on Don Giovanni, No Idea, SideOneDummy, 6131 Records and Yo-Yo Records.

In 2015 Worriers enlisted Laura Jane Grace of Against Me! to produce their album Imaginary Life. The band signed with SideOneDummy Records in June 2017, and released their second album Survival Pop in September of that year.

History
Worriers are a Brooklyn-based punk rock band formed by singer, guitarist, and songwriter Lauren Denitzio in 2011, who was previously a member of the Measure and is also a visual artist and a published author. Denitzio (who was credited as Lauren Measure on the group's first recordings) has been the sole constant in the Worriers' lineup, with Mikey Erg, Lou Hanman, John McLean, Rachel Rubino, Nick Psillas, and Audrey Zee Whitesides among Denitzio's most frequent collaborators.

The band released their first single Past Lives on No Idea Records in May 2011. After a second single, Sinead O'Rebellion through Yo-Yo Records, Worriers teamed up with Don Giovanni Records for the seven-song EP Cruel Optimist in October 2013.

In 2015 Worriers returned with Imaginary Life, the band's first album, with all songs written solely by Denitzio, and produced by Laura Jane Grace of Against Me! For this record the Worriers' lineup included Denitzio on lead vocals and guitar, guitarists Rachel Rubino and John McLean, bassist Audrey Zee Whitesides, and drummer Mike Yannich, with Lou Hanman guesting on backing vocals.

The band signed with SideOneDummy Records in June 2017, and released their second album Survival Pop in September of that year. For this record Denitzio was backed by Hanman on guitar, Nick Psillas on bass, and Mikey Erg on drums. With the scaling back of SideOneDummy's operations in early 2018 the band re-released the album with 6131 Records, and the addition of two new songs.

On December 12, 2019 Worriers announced they would be releasing a third album titled You or Someone You Know, again with 6131 Records, on March 6, 2020. For this record the lineup beyond Denitzio again included Nick Psillas on bass and Mikey Erg on drums, with the addition of Frank Piegaro (ex-Ensign) on guitar. The record was produced by John Agnello.

On May 21, 2021, it was announced the band contributed a cover of a Rancid song to Lavasock Records' tribute to Rancid's album ...And Out Come the Wolves titled ...And Out Come the Lawsuits.

On January 19, 2023 Worriers announced a new full-length album, Warm Blanket, would be released by Ernest Jenning Record Co. on April 7. It was entirely recorded and mixed by Denitzio at home, other than drums contributed remotely by Atom Willard of both Against Me! and Social Distortion. Along with the announcement was the release of lead single "Pollen In The Air", co-written with David Combs of Bad Moves and The Max Levine Ensemble.

Discography

Albums

EPs

References

External links
 Don Giovanni Records Official Website

Musical groups established in 2011
Don Giovanni Records artists
American punk rock groups
Punk rock groups from New York (state)
2011 establishments in New York City